Trefl Sopot is a Polish professional basketball team, based in Sopot, Poland. The team plays in the Polish Tauron Basket Liga. The club was founded as the replacement of Prokom Asseco Sopot that left the city of Sopot for Gdynia in 2009.

History
The team was founded as a phoenix club with a new corporate identity after Asseco Prokom Sopot decided to relocate to Gdynia. In its inaugural season, the club played in the Hali 100-lecia. At the beginning of the 2010–11 season, Trefl moved to the Ergo Arena, with a capacity of 15,000 people the largest arena in the PLK. In the 2011–12 season, Sopot reached the PLK Finals where the team faced its predecessor Asseco Prokom Gdynia. In a thrilling best-of-seven series, Sopot lost 4–3.

In 2011–12, Sopot won its first trophy when it won the Polish Cup. In the following season, Sopot repeated as Cup champions. Alongside these victories, the team also won the Polish Supercup in 2012 and 2013.

In the 2020–21 PLK season, Sopot finished 5th overall, a result that exceeded expectations.

Trophies
Polish League
Runners-up (1): 2011–12
Third place (1): 2013–14
Polish Cups
Winners (2): 2011–12, 2012–13, 2022–23
Polish Supercups (2):
Winners (2): 2012, 2013

Season by season

Players

Current roster

Notable players

Head coaches
 Kārlis Muižnieks
 Žan Tabak
 Darius Maskoliūnas

References

External links
 Official Trefl Sopot Website

Basketball teams established in 1995
Basketball teams in Poland
Sport in Sopot
Phoenix clubs (association football)